State Route 86 (SR 86) is a  state highway completely within Pickens County in the western part of the U.S. state of Alabama. The highway begins at the Mississippi state line and is a continuation of Mississippi Highway 388 (MS 388). The eastern terminus of the highway is at an intersection with U.S. Route 82 (US 82) at Gordo.

Route description

SR 86 is aligned along a two-lane roadway as it enters Alabama. Just east of the Mississippi state line, the highway crosses the Tom Bevill Lock and Dam and enters the town of Pickensville. The highway travels to the east as it continues across Pickens County, connecting Pickensville with Carrollton and Gordo, where it intersects US 82, which leads eastwardly to Tuscaloosa.

History

SR 86 was designated in 1957. The original route traveled from the Mississippi state line to Carrollton, replacing County Route 70. The highway was extended eastward to its current terminus in 1962, replacing County Route 12.

Major intersections

See also

References

086
Transportation in Pickens County, Alabama